Domestic violence in Uganda is a problem as it is in many parts of Africa.

There is a deep cultural belief in Uganda that it is socially acceptable to hit a woman to discipline her.

Wife beating costs the Ugandan economy billions of shillings per year.

See also
Women in Uganda

References

Uganda
Violence against women in Uganda
Violence in Uganda
Women's rights in Uganda